The 1954 SMU Mustangs football team represented Southern Methodist University (SMU) as a member of the Southwest Conference (SWC) during the 1954 college football season. Led by second-year head coach Woody Woodard, the Mustangs compiled an overall record of 6–3–1 with a mark of 4–1–1 in conference play, placing second in the SWC. SMU played home games at the Cotton Bowl in Dallas. Duane Nutt and Raymond Berry were the team captains.

Schedule

References

SMU
SMU Mustangs football seasons
SMU Mustangs football